Sam Parr State Fish and Wildlife Area is an Illinois state park on  in Jasper County, Illinois, United States.

References

State parks of Illinois
Protected areas of Jasper County, Illinois
Protected areas established in 1960
1960 establishments in Illinois